Greatest Hits: Believers Never Die – Volume Two is the second greatest hits album by American rock band Fall Out Boy, released through Island Records on November 15, 2019. It includes the single "Dear Future Self (Hands Up)" featuring Wyclef Jean. The album was supported by the Hella Mega Tour, which Fall Out Boy embarked with Weezer and Green Day. It was certified Silver by the BPI on 26 March 2021, denoting 60,000 sales.

Background
The album follows ten years after the band released their first greatest hits album, Believers Never Die – Greatest Hits, in November 2009, which featured the band's singles from 2003 to 2008 and two new tracks, and was issued as they went on hiatus.

Composition
The album contains eleven previously released singles from the band, including two unreleased tracks. Volume Two compiles hits from the band's initial post-hiatus work, consisting of 2013's Save Rock and Roll, 2015's American Beauty/American Psycho, and 2018's Mania, which took a noticeably more pop and pop rock approach. The album also contains the single "I've Been Waiting", a collaboration with artists Lil Peep and iLoveMakonnen.

Track listing
Track listing adapted from Fall Out Boy's official Twitter.

Charts

Weekly charts

Year-end charts

Certifications

References

2019 greatest hits albums
Fall Out Boy albums
Sequel albums